WXKB (103.9 FM) is a commercial radio station licensed to Cape Coral, Florida, and serving the Fort Myers-Naples radio market and Southwest Florida.  WXKB is owned by the Beasley Broadcast Group and airs a Top 40/CHR radio format branded as "B-103.9 All the Hits", sometimes called "The Killer B."  In afternoon drive time it carries On Air with Ryan Seacrest, syndicated by Premiere Networks. 

WXKB has studios and offices on South Tamiami Trail in Estero. The transmitter is off Carter Road, also in Estero.  WXKB broadcasts using HD Radio technology.  The digital subchannel feeds FM translator stations W243BM in Suncoast Estates at 96.5 MHz, W268AH in Bonita Springs at 101.5 MHz and W286AK in Naples at 105.1 MHz,

History
The station first signed on in 1975 as WRCC. Originally it was powered with 3,000 watts as a Class A station.  It has since boosted its power to 100,000 watts as a Class C station.  WRCC carried a classical music format. 

The station had several format changes throughout the years. From 1981 until 1984, the station ran an easy listening, middle of the road (MOR) format.  From 1984 until 1990, it played adult contemporary music. 

In 1990, its call sign was changed to WAKS.  The frequency moved one notch to 103.7 FM and it began running a classic rock format. This lasted until 1993 when the station returned back to its 103.9 frequency, changed its call letters to WXKB, and it flipped to Top 40 hits.  This was shortly after competitor 96.9 WINK-FM dropped Top 40 for adult contemporary music during the same year.

HD Radio
On July 9, 2021, WXKB-HD2 began broadcasting a classic hip hop format, branded as "96.5/101.5 The Bounce."  It is simulcast on FM translators W243BM at 96.5 FM, W268AH at 101.5 FM and W286AK at 105.1 FM.

WXKB's HD3 subchannel rebroadcasts the sports radio format on co-owned WBCN 770 AM.

References

External links
Official Website

XKB
Contemporary hit radio stations in the United States
Cape Coral, Florida
XKB
1975 establishments in Florida
Radio stations established in 1975